
When We Were Young may refer to:

Film
When We Were Young (film), a 1989 television film directed by Daryl Duke
When We Were Young (web series), a 2018 Chinese web series

Music

Albums
When We Were Young (album), a 2001 album by Dusted
When We Were Young, 1997 album by Eddie Hardin
When We Were Young, 2006 album by Akira the Don
When We Were Young, 2020 album by Eric Chou
When We Were Young: Live in London, 1972 album by Roxy Music

Songs
"When We Were Young" (Pat Lynch song), 1971
"When We Were Young" (Bucks Fizz song), 1983
"When We Were Young" (Human Nature song), 2001
"When We Were Young" (Sneaky Sound System song), 2008
"When We Were Young" (Take That song), 2011
"When We Were Young" (Dillon Francis and Sultan + Shepard song), 2014
"When We Were Young" (Adele song), 2015
"When We Were Young" (Passenger song), 2016
"When We Were Young", 2017 by Jo Harman
"When We Were Young", a song on the 1984 album Close Company by Lou Rawls
"When We Were Young", a song on the 1995 album Heartworm by Whipping Boy
"When We Were Young", a song on the 2004 album Happy Love Sick by Shifty Shellshock

Festivals
When We Were Young (festival), a music festival scheduled in October 2022

See also
 When We Were Very Young, a 1924 book of poetry by A. A. Milne
When You Were Young, a song by the Killers